is a Japanese actor who is represented by Stardust Promotion. Before taking his current stage name Seiyō Uchino in July 2013, he was known by his birth name Masaaki Uchino (same spelling in Japanese).

Filmography

TV series

Films

Awards and honours

References

External links
 

1968 births
Japanese male actors
Living people
People from Yokohama
Recipients of the Medal with Purple Ribbon
Stardust Promotion artists
Taiga drama lead actors
Waseda University alumni